Neo Jie Shi (born May 20, 1985) is a Singaporean marathon runner. She competed at the 2016 Summer Olympics in the women's marathon, in which she placed 131st.

References

External links
 
 
 
 
 

1985 births
Living people
Singaporean female marathon runners
Singaporean female athletes
Olympic athletes of Singapore
Athletes (track and field) at the 2016 Summer Olympics